This is Love Psychedelico is Love Psychedelico's American debut album which was released on May 20, 2008. The official Japanese release album title is This is Love Psychedelico ~U.S. Best~, released on June 18, 2008.

Overview
This album was announced for its release in the United States on April 23, 2008, on the official website along with the track listings. Many songs in the track listing are the same as songs featured on an earlier album Early Times released in 2005, however, the track listings on this American debut album only contains songs that were previously released as singles and albums and do not include new songs. Only the Japanese version contains the bonus tracks "dry town" and "Mind across the universe", nicknaming them "Bonus Tracks for Japan", however the bonus track "Mind across the universe" is available when purchasing the album through iTunes.

Track list

2008 compilation albums
Victor Entertainment compilation albums
Love Psychedelico albums